Sharad Kelkar (born 7 October 1976) is an Indian film actor and voice artist from Mumbai, Maharashtra. He works primarily in Hindi films, Marathi films. Kelkar has appeared as lead in television serials for brief period of time, now he do web series, regional language films in Telugu, Tamil and often dub Hollywood films.

Early and personal life
Kelkar hails from Jagdalpur, Chhattisgarh.

Kelkar married his co-star Keerti Gaekwad Kelkar on 3 June 2005. They both have participated in Nach Baliye 2.

Career
Kelkar was a Grasim Mr. India finalist. In 2004, he made his television debut with the show Aakrosh which aired on Doordarshan in which he played the role of Inspector Sachin Kulkarni.

His wife Keerti Gaekwad Kelkar is a television actress who has appeared in Saat Phere: Saloni Ka Safar as Chandni / Devika in a negative role. Together, in 2006 the couple also appeared on the dance reality show Nach Baliye 2.

In 2007, Kelkar hosted Rock-N-Roll Family along with former Hero Honda Sa Re Ga Ma Pa Challenge 2007 contestant Mauli Dave. Kelkar was host of the show Pati Patni Aur Woh on NDTV Imagine in 2009. Then he appeared as Thakur Digvijay Singh Bhadoria in Bairi Piya which earned him critical acclaim for his performance. In 2010, he participated in reality comedy TV series, Comedy Circus Mahasangram (2010) paired with Bharti Singh and Paresh Ganatra. In 2011, Kelkar played a grey character role of Satya in Uttaran he entered the show along with Harsha Khandeparkar who played his sister in the show. His role lasted for about six months in the show. Kelkar was also part of Marath film Chinu where he played the hero to the female protagonist who plays the title role of Chinu. In 2012, he replaced Mohnish Behl as Dr. Ashutosh in the serial Kuch Toh Log Kahenge which aired on Sony Entertainment Television India. From 2010 to 2013, he presented a crime show, Shaitaan - A Criminal Mind.

In 2013, Kelkar was offered a role in Sanjay Leela Bhansali's Goliyon Ki Raasleela Ram-Leela where he plays the role of a possessive elder brother. Then in 2014, he was seen in Lai Bhaari where he played Sangram the main antagonist. The film became the highest-grossing Marathi film. In 2015, he was seen in Hero and did a special appearance for a single song in A Paying Ghost.

From September 2015 to April 2016, Kelkar was seen as Agent Raghav Sinha in his crime and mystery thriller Agent Raghav - Crime Branch which aired on &TV. He describes his role as "Here's a guy who is suave and dapper, with an IQ that can give even the most intelligent and shrewd criminal a run for his money. He can do things that very few can - read people's minds and use deductive reasoning. I haven't played such a character or taken up a crime series like this before. Besides, the premise of the show was unique and I couldn't let it go.". In 2016 he was seen in Mohenjo Daro, Rocky Handsome which released on 25 March 2016. In the same year, he also did his Telugu debut through Sardaar Gabbar Singh where he played the main antagonist Bhairav Singh.
 
In 2017, he was seen in Indian television show Koi Laut Ke Aaya Hai as Rishabh Singh Shekhari. He also played the main antagonist Dhauli in Sanjay Dutt starrer Bhoomi. He also appeared in Irada as Paddy F Sharma a business tycoon. He also acted in Sangharsh Yatra Biopic of late Gopinath Munde a famous BJP politician in Maharashtra. He did guest appearances in movies like Guest in London and Baadshaho. He also debuted as a producer for Marathi film Idak : The Goat which was screened at the Cannes festival.

In 2018, he acted in three Marathi films Rakshas, Madhuri, and Youngraad. He was also seen in a music video Majbooriyan.

In 2019, he did his debut short film Through Purple. He also did his digital debut web series through The Family Man, an Amazon prime series. Then he was seen in Housefull 4 where he played as Suryabhan/Michael Bhai one of the antagonists. His another web-series Rangbaaz phirse (season 2) released in December 2019.

In 2020 January, he played the role of Chhatrapati Shivaji Maharaj in the film Tanhaji. he was appreciated for his performance. Anna M. M. Vetticad of Firstpost praised the portrayal of Laxmii by Sharad Kelkar calling it a mature performance. He was also seen in ZEE5 series Black Widows opposite Mona Singh in December 2020

In 2021, he played the role of a military officer in the film Bhuj: The Pride of India.

In 2022, He played a dark-shaded character in Operation Romeo. In the film, he played the character of a police officer. Then he played the Antagonist role in Code Name: Tiranga. His Next release was Pan Indian Marathi historical Period film Har Har Mahadev playing the role of Bhaji Prabhu Deshpande,a Maratha warrior character in the film.

In 2023,he will be debuting in Tamil through Ayalaan. He will also be debuting as a lead actor through Hindi film Deja vu. He is also reported to be part of  upcoming films like oh my dog, Nayeka, chathrapathi, Rainbow.He will also be playing a character in Chor nikal ke bhaga which is an OTT film awaiting for release in netflix.He will be playing the lead in his upcoming Marathi Action film  Raanti which is a remake of kannada film  Ugramm.He is also part of the biopic fim Sri. His upcoming web series is Doctors, which is said to be medical drama. Another web series is Indian Police Force, which is a police action show.

Filmography

Film

Television

Web series

{| class="sortable wikitable"
! Year
! Name
! Role
! OTT Platform
|-
| 2019–present
|The Family Man|| Arvind || Amazon prime
|-
|2019
| Rangbaaz Phir Se || Raja Phogat || Zee5
|-
| 2020 || Special OPS || IB Officer Surya|| Disney Hotstar
|-
|2021
|Black Widows|| Yatin Mehrotra || Zee5 
|-
| rowspan="3" |2023|| style="background:#ffc;|Doctors
|Ishaan || TBA 
|-
| style="background:#ffc;|Indian Police Force || TBA || Amazon prime
|}

 Music videos 

Voice acting 
Dubbing roles
Hollywood films

South Indian films

Web series

 Awards 
 2010 - Gold Awards for Best Actor in a Negative Role (Critics) — Bairi Piya.
 2017-Nominated- SIIMA Award for Best Actor in a Negative Role (Telugu) for -Sardaar Gabbar Singh''

See also
List of Indian television actors
Dubbing (filmmaking)
List of Indian Dubbing Artists

References

External links

 
 

Indian male television actors
Indian male voice actors
People from Gwalior
Male actors in Hindi cinema
Male actors in Marathi cinema
Male actors in Tamil cinema
Male actors in Telugu cinema
Living people
1972 births